Robert Murray Gibson (August 20, 1869 – December 19, 1949) was a United States district judge of the United States District Court for the Western District of Pennsylvania. Prior to his legal career, he briefly played professional baseball for the Chicago Colts and Pittsburgh Alleghenys.

Early life and education

Born in Duncansville, Pennsylvania, Gibson received an Artium Baccalaureus degree from Washington & Jefferson College in 1889.

Baseball career

After graduating from college, Gibson joined Cap Anson's Chicago Colts as a pitcher, making his big league debut on June 4, 1890 at the age of twenty. The 6'3", 185-pound right-hander pitched only one game for the Colts, a complete game win, before moving to the Pittsburgh Alleghenys, where he lost all three of his starts. In 21 innings of work, he had an ERA of 9.86. He walked 25 and struck out only four. As a hitter, Gibson had a .176 batting average in seventeen at-bats. He committed a total of five errors, two of which were from when he spent time in the outfield.

Career

Gibson read law to enter the bar in 1894. He was an Assistant United States Attorney for the Western District of Pennsylvania from 1904 to 1914 and a special assistant to the United States Attorney General from 1912 to 1913. He was an assistant district attorney of Allegheny County, Pennsylvania from 1914 to 1922.

Federal judicial service

On July 18, 1922, Gibson was nominated by President Warren G. Harding to a seat on the United States District Court for the Western District of Pennsylvania vacated by Judge Charles Prentiss Orr. Gibson was confirmed by the United States Senate on July 24, 1922, and received his commission the same day. He served as Chief Judge from 1948 to 1949, assuming senior status on January 31, 1949. Gibson served in that capacity for less than a year, until his death on December 19, 1949, in Pittsburgh, Pennsylvania. He was interred in Homewood Cemetery in Pittsburgh.

References

External links
 
 

1869 births
1949 deaths
Judges of the United States District Court for the Western District of Pennsylvania
Washington & Jefferson College alumni
United States district court judges appointed by Warren G. Harding
20th-century American judges
Baseball players from Pennsylvania
Major League Baseball pitchers
Chicago Colts players
Pittsburgh Alleghenys players
Penn State Nittany Lions baseball players
Wheeling National Citys players
Wheeling Nailers (baseball) players
Jamestown (minor league baseball) players
Memphis Giants players
19th-century baseball players
Burials at Homewood Cemetery
United States federal judges admitted to the practice of law by reading law
Assistant United States Attorneys